Pontecagnano Faiano (also known simply as Pontecagnano) is a town and comune of the province of Salerno in the Campania region of south-west Italy.  The area dates back to Roman times when the city of Picentia stood in the place and was destroyed by the Romans after the Second Punic War.

Geography

Located in the south-eastern suburb of Salerno, the municipality is formed by the towns of Pontecagnano (main center and municipal seat), Faiano (a little hilltown, secondary seat) and by the villages of Baroncino, Corvinia, Magazzeno, Pagliarone, Picciola and Sant'Antonio a Picenzia. It borders with Battipaglia, Bellizzi, Giffoni Valle Piana, Montecorvino Pugliano and Salerno.

The town of Pontecagnano is the municipal seat and the most populated settlement of the comune. It is situated close to the urban area of Salerno and few kilometers by the coast.

The village of Faiano, the co-official administrative seat, is located few kilometers of Pontecagnano on the hills on the road to Montecorvino Pugliano, next to the Monti Picentini. It is locally known to be rich of water.

The civil parishes are Magazzeno (by the coast), Picciola (close to the airport of Salerno), Sant'Antonio a Picenzia (close to Pontecagnano) and Baroncino (between Pontecagnano and Faiano).

History
The area of Pontecagnano was settled as early as the Copper Age (3500-2300 BC), as testified by the archaeological excavations of two sanctuaries and two necropolises. In the 9th-8th centuries BC remains belonging to the Villanovan Culture, predecessor to the Etruscans, have been found.

The Etruscan center was perhaps called Amina and dated to the 6th century BC. At the height of its power it ruled all the land from Salerno to the Silaurus (Sele) River.  It was known for a temple of the Argive Juno reputedly built by Jason.   Here, in 268 BC, the Romans built a new town, Picentia, to house a nucleus of deported Piceni.

See also
Salerno-Pontecagnano Airport
National Archeologic Museum of Pontecagnano

Transport
Salerno Costa d'Amalfi Airport

References

External links

Official website 

Cities and towns in Campania
Villanovan culture